Chris Sernel, also known as Oh, Hush!, is an American recording artist and Grammy-nominated producer.

Early in his career, Sernel reveled in anonymity under the Oh, Hush! alias, not performing shows or giving interviews and relying heavily on word of mouth in contrast to usual music industry norms.

Shortly after the release of the debut The Yellow Album, Oh, Hush! was signed by Mike Caren of Artist Publishing Group.
Oh, Hush! has composed music for commercials for companies such as Dunkin Donuts, Wal-Mart, & Nutella.

Discography

Studio albums
 Oh, Hush! The Yellow Album (LP)
 Oh, Hush! Don’t Judge A Record By Its Covers (EP)
 Oh, Hush! Criminal (EP)
 Oh, Hush! The Purple (EP)
 Oh, Hush! Hush! The Herald Angels Sing (EP)
 Oh, Hush! The White Christmas Album (EP)
 Oh, Hush! Christmas Vacation (EP)

Cuts

Film placements
 The LEGO Ninjago Movie (Warner Bros)
 The LEGO Batman Movie (Warner Bros)
 The Twilight Saga: Eclipse (Summit)
  The Loud House Movie (Netflix)
 A Loud House Christmas (Nickelodeon)
 Blindspotting (Lions Gate)
Marmaduke (20th Century Fox)
 Flicka: Country Pride (20th Century Fox)
 Where The Wild Things Are (Warner Bros)
 Yogi Bear 3D (Warner Bros)
 Same Time, Next Christmas (ABC)

TV placements
 Legacies (The CW)
 Lucifer (Netflix)
 The Simpsons (Fox)
 American Idol (Fox)
 Pretty Little Liars (ABC Family)
 Selling Sunset (Netflix)
 Siesta Key (MTV)
 Love & Hip Hop (VH1)
 Baby Shark's Big Show! (Nickelodeon)
 The Voice (NBC)
 Ghost Whisperer (CBS)
 Ugly Betty (ABC)
 90210 (CBS)
 BH90210 (Fox)
 Diary of a Future President (Disney)
 The Mindy Project (Fox)
 Revenge (ABC)
 Invisible Sister (Disney)
 Recovery Road (Freeform)
 The City (MTV)
 The Troop (Nickelodeon)
 Bring The Funny (NBC)
 Abby Hatcher, Fuzzly Catcher (Nickelodeon) - Theme Song
 Slime Time Live (Nickelodeon)
 Eurovision (BBC)
 Poo-Pourri "Imagine Where You Can Go" (AMP Award Winning)
 CBS Promos
 Fox Promos
 Dunkin' Donuts
 Sargento
 Ruby Tuesday
 Skechers
 Nutella
 Clorox
 Calvin Klein
 Sears
 WalMart
 Kohl's
 One-A-Day Vitamins
 Cox Internet and TV
 Five Below
 Snuggle
 Lululemon
 WWE 
 Kentucky Derby
 NASCAR
 Green Bay Packers
 Univ. Texas Longhorns
 Baseball Hall of Fame
 Florida Gators
 Carolina Panthers

Video game placements
 MLB 2K9 (MLB Sports)
 Xbox

References

External links 
 Oh, Hush! on YouTube
 KMA Management

American singer-songwriters
Living people
Year of birth missing (living people)